Raphe Malik, born Laurence Mazel (November 1, 1948 in Cambridge, Massachusetts – March 8, 2006 in Guilford, Vermont) was an American jazz trumpeter.

Career 
Malik studied at the University of Massachusetts (1966–70), then moved to Paris, where he played with Frank Wright and members of the Art Ensemble of Chicago. After returning to Ohio, he began working with Cecil Taylor in the mid-1970s, including at Carnegie Hall and for tours of Europe. He and Taylor collaborated through much of the 1970s and 1980s. In 1976, Malik performed in a production of Adrienne Kennedy's A Rat's Mass directed by Cecil Taylor at La MaMa Experimental Theatre Club in the East Village of Manhattan. Musicians Rashid Bakr, Andy Bey, Karen Borca, David S. Ware, and Jimmy Lyons also performed in the production. Taylor's production combined the original script with a chorus of orchestrated voices used as instruments.

In the 1990s, Malik recorded several albums as a leader, and played with Dennis Warren in the Full Metal Revolutionary Jazz Ensemble.

Discography

As leader

As sideman 
With Jimmy Lyons
 Wee Sneezawee (Black Saint, 1983)
 The Box Set (Ayler, 2003)

With Sabir Mateen
 Secrets of When (Bleu Regard, 2001)

With Alan Silva
Alan Silva & the Sound Visions Orchestra (Eremite, 2001) – live recorded in 1999

With Glenn Spearman
 Free Worlds (Black Saint, 2000)

With Cecil Taylor
 1976: Dark to Themselves (Enja, 1977)
 1978: Cecil Taylor Unit (New World, 1978)
 1978: 3 Phasis (New World, 1978)
 1978: Live in the Black Forest (MPS, 1978) – live
 1978: One Too Many Salty Swift and Not Goodbye (Hat Hut, 1980) – live
 1980: It Is in the Brewing Luminous (Hat Hut, 1981) – live

References

External links 

 Chris Kelsey on [ Raphe Malik] at Allmusic
Malik's obituary at jazzhouse.org (by Todd S. Jenkins)
Malik's page on La MaMa Archives Digital Collections
 

1948 births
2006 deaths
American jazz trumpeters
American male trumpeters
Jazz musicians from Massachusetts
20th-century American musicians
20th-century trumpeters
20th-century American male musicians
American male jazz musicians